"Touch Me" is a song by the Doors from their 1969 album The Soft Parade. Written by guitarist Robby Krieger in late 1968, it is notable for its extensive usage of brass and string instruments, including a solo by featured saxophonist Curtis Amy.

It was released as a single in December 1968 and reached No. 3 on the Billboard Hot 100  (their last Top Ten hit in US) and No. 1 in the Cashbox Top 100 in early 1969 (the band's third American number-one single). The single also did well elsewhere, peaking at No. 1 in the RPM Canadian Singles Chart and at No. 10 in the Kent Music Report in Australia. However, despite the band's commercial success the previous year, "Touch Me" did not chart in the UK Singles Chart.

Composition
According to Bruce Botnick's liner notes, the song was initially referred to by its various working titles; "I'm Gonna Love You", from a line in the chorus, or "Hit Me", a reference to blackjack. The opening line was originally "C'mon, hit me ... I'm not afraid", the line thus reflecting the first person vantage point of a blackjack player. Lead singer Jim Morrison changed the lyric out of concern that rowdy crowds at their live shows would mistakenly believe that "hit me" was a challenge to physically assault him.  Additionally, at the end of the song, Morrison can be heard shouting "stronger than dirt", which was a slogan from an Ajax commercial.

Billboard described the single as having "all the drive and rhythm of their No. 1 winner 'Hello, I Love You'," stating that "the Doors
have a smash follow -up here."  Cash Box described it as "a marvelous track" in which the Doors "add a helping of beat to their hard-hitting style."

Musical style and structure

"Touch Me" incorporates influences from traditional pop music. The introduction is notated in the key of Bb Minor with a 4/4 time signature. The song's writer, Robby Krieger, interpolated the guitar riff from the 1967 Four Seasons song "C'mon Marianne".
The track's last section piece includes a jazz-inflected saxophone solo played by Curtis Amy. In a 1970 interview with Downbeat Magazine, Morrison reported that he was really proud that "Touch Me" was "the first rock hit to have a jazz solo in it".

In the book A to X of Alternative Music, "Touch Me" was described as a "solid gold soul classic". Writing for AllMusic, critic Jason Elias wrote that the song has "the style of pop and pure lounge." Some critics suggested the track blends pop with psychedelic rock; a combination which was unique at the time. It has also been characterized, along with other album tracks, as an early attempt of progressive rock.

Other version
"Touch Me" was remixed with added bass and compression and this version appeared on a 1974 compilation called Heavy Metal released via Warner Bros. Special Products. The song was later released as one of the first downloadable content songs for Rock Band 3, along with several other songs by the band.

Personnel
The Doors
Jim Morrison – lead vocals
Ray Manzarek – Gibson Kalamazoo organ, celesta
Robby Krieger – guitar
John Densmore – drums

Additional personnel
Paul Harris – orchestral arrangements
Curtis Amy – tenor saxophone (solo)
Harvey Brooks – bass guitar

Chart history

Weekly charts

Year-end charts

Certifications

References

The Doors songs
1968 singles
Cashbox number-one singles
RPM Top Singles number-one singles
Songs written by Robby Krieger
Song recordings produced by Paul A. Rothchild
1968 songs
Elektra Records singles